Annie Cohen Kopchovsky (1870 – 11 November 1947), known as Annie Londonderry, was a Jewish Latvian immigrant to the United States who in 1894–95 became the first woman to bicycle around the world. After having completed her travel, she built a media career around engagement with popular conception of what it was to be female.

Early life and marriage 
Annie Cohen was born in Latvia to Levi (Leib) and Beatrice (Basha) Cohen. She had two older siblings, Sarah and Bennett. Her family moved to the United States in 1875 and she became a citizen as a child, only four or five years old.

They settled in Boston, Massachusetts, and lived in a tenement on Spring Street. On January 17, 1887, her father died, and her mother died two months later. Her older sister Sarah was already married and living in Maine, leaving Annie (age 17) and her brother Bennett (age 20) to take care of their younger siblings Jacob and Rosa (ages 10 and 8 or 9 at the time, respectively). Annie and Bennett both soon married, and brought their spouses to share their Spring Street home.

In 1888 Annie Cohen married Simon "Max" Kopchovsky, a peddler. They had three children in the next four years: Bertha Malkie (Mollie), Libbie, and Simon. Her brother Bennett married Bertha, and they had two children. Her brother Jacob died of a lung infection at age 17. Max, a devout Orthodox Jew, attended synagogue and studied the Torah, while Annie sold advertising space for several daily Boston newspapers.

Trip around the world

The wager
The inspiration for betting (or falsely claiming there was a bet) on a bicycle journey around the world likely came from a former Harvard student E. C. Pfeiffer. Under the pseudonym Paul Jones, he started bicycling in mid-February 1894 claiming to be attempting a trip around the world in one year on a $5,000 wager. Two weeks later, the bet was revealed to be fake. Later in 1894, two rich Boston men allegedly wagered $20,000 against $10,000 that no woman could travel around the world by bicycle in 15 months and earn $5000. It is doubtful there was ever a wager. The alleged bettors were never named.

Londonderry's great-grand nephew and author of the authoritative history of her journey, Peter Zheutlin, has stated that "It's virtually certain, for example, that she concocted the wager story to sensationalize her trip". If Annie's gambit was a stunt, one person stood to benefit: Colonel Albert Pope, the owner of Pope Manufacturing Company of Boston and Hartford, which produced, among many other things, Columbia bicycles. His senior salesman at Columbia's main store in Boston delivered one of their models for the start of the journey. The choice of a woman was an obvious extension of previous exploits. In 1887 Thomas Stevens had become the first person to bicycle around the world. Moreover, the bicycle craze of the 1890s was providing women with an independent method of transportation and fomenting an evolution in women's clothing, from full skirts and heavy material to bloomers that allow for more mobility and freedom of movement.

Annie Kopchovsky was a highly unlikely choice for the completion of this wager, starting with her name, which identified her as a Jew in a city and country where anti-Semitism was widespread. She lacked the experience, never having ridden a bicycle until a few days before her trip, and had a slight build, only 5 foot 3, about 100 pounds. In addition, she was a married woman and a mother of three children, ages five, three, and two.

Sponsorships were crucial to financing the enterprise and the publicity surrounding it. Her 42-pound Columbia women's bike carried a placard attached to the rear wheel that advertised New Hampshire's Londonderry Lithia Spring Water Company, for which the company paid her $100 and she in turn agreed to go by the name "Annie Londonderry" for the duration of her trip.

Setting out
On June 27, 1894, at about 11 o'clock in the morning, Londonderry set off from the Massachusetts State House on Beacon Hill. The 24-year-old wore a long skirt, corset and high collar and carried with her a change of clothes and a pearl-handled pistol. On her route to Chicago, she chose cycling routes published in tour books by the League of American Wheelmen. These tour books contained distances, road conditions, landmarks, places to eat, and hotels that offered cyclist discounts, and provided company as many other cyclists rode the same routes. With good weather and roads, she was able to average between eight and ten miles per day.

When she arrived in Chicago on September 24, she had lost 20 pounds and the desire to continue. Winter was coming, and she realized she could not make it across the mountains to San Francisco before snow started to fall. Prior to leaving Chicago to ride home to Boston, she met with Sterling Cycle Works, whose offices and factory were located on Carroll Avenue.

Europe and Asia
With the change in dress and bicycle, Londonderry was determined to complete her world trip, even though she only had eleven months to make it back to Chicago. She followed her route back to New York City, and on November 24, 1894, she boarded the French liner La Touraine, destined for Le Havre on France's north coast. She arrived on December 3 and became wrapped up in bureaucracy. Her bike was confiscated by custom officials, her money was taken, and the French press wrote insulting articles about her appearance. She managed to free herself and rode from Paris to Marseille. Despite being held up by bad weather, she arrived in two weeks by cycling and train with one foot bandaged and propped up on her handlebars due to an injury on the road.

Londonderry left Marseille on the 413-foot steamship Sydney with only eight months to get back to Chicago. The wager did not dictate a minimum cycling distance, so she sailed from place to place, completing day-trips at each stop along the way. She visited many places, including Alexandria, Colombo, Singapore, Saigon, Hong Kong, Shanghai, Nagasaki and Kobe.

Return to the United States
On March 9, 1895, Londonderry sailed from Yokohama, Japan, and reached the Golden Gate in San Francisco on March 23. She rode to Los Angeles, through Arizona and New Mexico and on to El Paso. At one point, she and another cyclist were almost killed by a runaway horse and wagon. They received minor injuries, yet she claimed that she had been knocked out and taken to a hospital in Stockton where she coughed up blood for two days. In fact, she had given a lecture in Mozart Hall in Stockton the evening after the accident.

The Southern Pacific Railway tracks offered many benefits to cyclists traveling across southern California and Arizona, and Londonderry took advantage of them. Riders could follow service roads made of hard packed dirt and stop at shelters for train crews, where they could get a meal and a bath. Some presume she rode the train across parts of the desert, though she claims to have declined rides from passing train crews. From El Paso, she traveled north, leaving Albuquerque on July 20, 1895, bound for Denver, where she arrived on August 12. She rode the train across most of Nebraska because of the muddy roads. Near Gladbrook, Iowa, she broke her wrist when she crashed into a group of pigs and was forced to wear a cast for the remainder of her trip.

On September 12, 1895, Londonderry arrived in Chicago, accompanied by two cyclists she had met in Clinton, Iowa, and collected her $10,000 prize. She had made it around the world fourteen days under allowed time. She was back home in Boston on September 24, arriving fifteen months after she had left. When she published an account of her exploits in the New York World on October 20, 1895, the newspaper headline described it as "the Most Extraordinary Journey Ever Undertaken by a Woman". Despite criticism that she traveled more "with" a bicycle than on one, she proved a formidable cyclist at impromptu local races en route across America.

Entrepreneurship 
Londonderry was a brilliant saleswoman and an exceptional storyteller, raising all of the money and attracting the media attention necessary for her trip to be a success. Her main income was from selling advertising space on her bike and person, hanging ribbons and signs for products ranging from bicycle tires to perfume. Her first sponsor was the Londonderry Lithia Spring Water Company of New Hampshire, which paid her $100 to carry a placard on her bike with its company name and to use the name "Annie Londonderry" throughout her trip. In Chicago, she received sponsorship from Sterling Cycle Company for promotion of its products when she swapped her bulky Columbia for the faster and lighter Sterling Roadster.

During her travels, she gave lectures about her adventures, often exaggerating her exploits. These enthralled the media and boosted her popularity. For instance, in France she described herself as an orphan, wealthy heiress, a Harvard medical student, the inventor of a new method of stenography, and the niece of a U.S. senator. While in the United States, she told stories about hunting tigers in India with German royalty and getting sent to a Japanese prison with a bullet wound. She also gave cycling demonstrations and sold promotional photos of herself, souvenir pins, and autographs.

After the trip, she accepted an offer to write about her adventures as the "New Woman" and moved her family to New York City to continue her journalism career. The article began "I am a journalist and a 'new woman,' if that term means that I believe I can do anything that any man can do."

Legacy 
Londonderry died in obscurity in 1947. In 2007 Peter Zheutlin, her great-nephew, published Around the World on Two Wheels: Annie Londonderry's Extraordinary Ride. In 2011, Evalyn Parry premiered SPIN, her bicycle-themed performance piece that includes a song about Londonderry ("The Ballad of Annie Londonderry"), and presented it on tour in Canada and the US.

Gillian Klempner Willman of Spokeswoman Productions wrote, directed and produced a 26-minute documentary film titled The New Woman - Annie "Londonderry" Kopchovsky. It premiered in February 2013 at the DC Independent Film Festival, where it won the award for Best Documentary.

Londonderry was featured in an obituary in The New York Times, as part of their "Overlooked" series in November 2019.

In August 2022, RIDE, a new musical starring Liv Andrusier and Yuki Sutton, based on Annie Londonderry debuted at the Charing Cross Theatre.

Timeline of the trip 
Her trip proceeded according to this timeline:
[No dates specified for cities except for those given below]
June 25, 1894 - Boston, Massachusetts
Providence, Rhode Island
New York City, New York
Albany, New York
Syracuse, New York
Rochester, New York
Buffalo, New York
Cleveland, Ohio
September 24, 1894 - Chicago, Illinois
Same route back to New York City
Moscow
November 24, 1894 - New York City, New York
December 3, 1894 - Le Havre, France
Paris, France
Lyon and Valence, France
Marseille, France
Alexandria and Port Said, Egypt
Jerusalem, Israel
Aden, Yemen
Colombo, Sri Lanka
Singapore
Saigon, Vietnam
Hong Kong and Port Arthur, China
Korea to Vladivostok, Russia (unconfirmed)
March 9, 1895 - Nagasaki and Yokohama, Japan
March 23, 1895 - San Francisco, California
Stockton, California
San Jose, California
San Luis Obispo, California
Santa Barbara, California
Los Angeles, California
San Bernardino, California
Riverside, California
Indio, California
Yuma, Arizona
Phoenix, Arizona
Tucson, Arizona
Deming, New Mexico
El Paso, Texas
Albuquerque, New Mexico 
Santa Fe, New Mexico
Las Vegas, New Mexico
Raton, New Mexico
Raton Pass
Trinidad, Colorado
La Junta, Colorado
Colorado Springs, Colorado
August 12, 1895 - Denver, Colorado
Cheyenne, Wyoming
Train through Nebraska
Fremont, Nebraska
Omaha, Nebraska
Missouri Valley, Iowa
Ames, Iowa
Tama, Iowa
Cedar Rapids, Iowa
Clinton, Iowa
 Berlin, Deutschland
Rochelle, Illinois
September 12, 1895 - Chicago, Illinois
September 24, 1895 - Boston, Massachusetts

See also
Around the world cycling record and Cycling records
Bicycling and feminism
Elizabeth Robins Pennell, who wrote of her cycling tours around Europe in the 1880s
Fanny Bullock Workman, who toured by bicycle in Europe, Algeria and India in the 1890s
Frances Willard (suffragist)
Laura Dekker
Nellie Bly
Thomas Stevens (cyclist)

References

Further reading

External links
Annie Londonderry — the first woman to bicycle around the world
A documentary film, The New Woman, Annie Londonderry Kopchovsky, by Gillian Willman

1870 births
1947 deaths
American female cyclists
Sportspeople from Riga
Cycling journalists
Solo female touring cyclists
Ultra-distance cyclists
American businesspeople
American Jews
Latvian Jews